This is a list of seasons completed by the Orlando Predators. The Predators were a professional arena football franchise of the Arena Football League (AFL), based in Orlando, Florida. The team was established in 1991 and last played its home games at Amway Center. The franchise has played in seven ArenaBowls, only winning ArenaBowl XII and ArenaBowl XIV. Prior to the 2009 season, the AFL announced that it had suspended operations indefinitely and canceled the 2009 season. In September 2009, it was announced that the Predators would return for the 2010 season when the league relaunched. The Predators folded after the 2016 season.

References
General
 

Specific

Arena Football League seasons by team
 
Orlando, Florida-related lists
Florida sports-related lists